Irakli Klimiashvili (born 30 May 1988) is a Georgian footballer, who plays for Gareji Sagarejo.

Largely known for his successful tenure at WIT Georgia, in the late 2000s Klimiashvili was a member of the national team as well.

Career
As a footballer, Irakli Klimiashvili grew up at WIT Georgia, one of the most decorated Georgian teams in the first decade of XXI century.

After three years at the youth club, in 2005 he was promoted to the main team, which had won the national league in the previous year. In the next three years they twice finished as runner-ups before securing another top title in 2009. Being a key player in his club, Klimishvili was regularly called up by U21 team. 

He made his debut for Georgian national team on 27 May 2008 in a 1–1 friendly game against Estonia as a substitute. Later he featured in four more matches, including in a UEFA World Cup qualifying game against Montenegro. 

In 2013, Klimiashvili joined the Latvian side Skonto Riga, which came 2nd both in the league and Cup competitions this season.

Since 2018 he has been playing in the Georgian second division.

Honours
Umaglesi Liga	

 Winner	(1):	2008/2009

David Kipiani Cup	
 Winner	(1):	2009/2010

Georgian Super Cup	

 Winner	(1):	2009/2010

 Runner-up	(1):	2010/2011

Uzbekistan Cup

	Winner	(1):	2011

Latvian Virsliga	

 Runner-up	(2):	2013, 2014

Latvian Cup
	Runner-up (1):	2013/2014

References

External links

*
Irakli Klimiashvili at Footballdatabase

1988 births
Living people
Footballers from Georgia (country)
Footballers from Tbilisi
Georgia (country) international footballers
Association football forwards
Expatriate footballers from Georgia (country)
FC WIT Georgia players
FC Anzhi Makhachkala players
Pakhtakor Tashkent FK players
FC Dila Gori players
FC Sioni Bolnisi players
Skonto FC players
Expatriate footballers in Latvia
Expatriate sportspeople from Georgia (country) in Latvia
FC Torpedo Kutaisi players
FC Zugdidi players
Expatriate sportspeople from Georgia (country) in Uzbekistan
Expatriate sportspeople from Georgia (country) in Russia
Expatriate footballers in Russia
Expatriate footballers in Uzbekistan
Erovnuli Liga players